Dolná Mičiná is a village and municipality of the Banská Bystrica District in the Banská Bystrica Region of Slovakia

History
In historical records, the village was first mentioned in 1402 (1402 Alsowfalu, 1565 Inferior Mychyna, 1572 Mykefalwa). In the 16th century, it belonged to local feudatory Micsinyey, and, later on, to Benicky family.

References

External links
https://web.archive.org/web/20080111223415/http://www.statistics.sk/mosmis/eng/run.html
http://www.dolnamicina.sk/

Villages and municipalities in Banská Bystrica District